Scrobipalpa bigoti is a moth in the family Gelechiidae. It was described by Povolný in 1973. It is found in Tunisia, Spain, southern France, Sicily, Greece and Cyprus.

The forewings are covered by mixed whitish and blackish scales, although sometimes there are only whitish black-tipped scales. The hindwings are dirty grey-whitish.

References

Scrobipalpa
Moths described in 1973